Jalal-al-Din Amir-Chakhmaq, known as Jalal, was the Governor of Yazd, Iran in the Timurid Era.

References

Iranian politicians
Timurid dynasty